Mahmoud Hassan may refer to:

  (1893–?), Egyptian diplomat
 Hussein Mahmoud Hassan el-Shafei (1918–2005), Egyptian politician
 Mahmoud Hassan (wrestler) (1919–1998), Egyptian wrestler
 Mahmoud Hassan Bani-Ahmad, father of Princess Basmah Bani Ahmad
 Mahmoud Hassan (footballer, born 1943), Egyptian footballer
 Mahmoud Hassan Saleh (born 1962), Egyptian footballer
 Mahmoud Hassan Mgimwa (born 1963), Tanzanian politician
 Mohamed Mahmoud Hassan (born 1984), Egyptian hammer thrower
 Mahmoud Hassan (footballer, born 1984), Emirati footballer
 Trézéguet (Egyptian footballer) (Mahmoud Ahmed Ibrahim Hassan, born 1994), Egyptian footballer

See also
 Hassan (surname)
 Mohammed Hassan (disambiguation)
 Muhammad Hassan (disambiguation)
 Mahmud al-Hasan (1851–1920), also known as Mahmud Hasan, Deobandi Sunni Muslim scholar
 Mahmud Hasan (academic) (1897–?), Bengali academic
 Mahmood Hasan Gangohi (1907–1996), Indian Mufti and Islamic scholar
 Abul Hassan Mahmood Ali (born 1943), Bangladeshi politician
 Hassan Sheikh Mohamud (born 1955), Somali politician
 Mahmoud al-Sarkhi (Sayyid Mahmoud al-Hassani al-Sarkhi, born 1964), Iraqi Shi'ite Muslim cleric
 Adnan Hassan Mahmoud (born 1966), former minister of information of Syria
 Hassan Abdel-Fattah (Hassan Abdel-Fattah Mahmoud Al-Mahsiri, born 1982), Jordanian footballer
 Mosaab Mahmoud Al Hassan (born 1983), Qatari footballer
 Mahmud Hassan, Bangladeshi physician
 Ahmed Hassan Mahmoud, Egyptian Paralympic athlete